Bestia is a genus of mosses belonging to the family Lembophyllaceae.

The genus name of Bestia is in honour of George Newton Best (1846–1926), an American bryologist, expert on moss taxonomy, and the second president of the Sullivant Moss Society.

Species:
 Bestia breweriana (Lesq.) Grout
 Bestia cristata (Hampe) L.F. Koch
 Bestia holzingeri (Renauld & Cardot) Broth.
 Bestia longipes (Sull. & Lesq.) Broth.
 Bestia obtusatula (Kindb.) Broth.
 Bestia occidentalis (Kindb.) Grout
 Bestia vancouveriensis (Kindb.) Wijk & Margad.

References

Hypnales
Moss genera